Austrarcturellidae is a family of crustaceans belonging to the order Isopoda.

Genera:
 Abyssarcturella Poore & Bardsley, 1992
 Austrarcturella Poore & Bardsley, 1992
 Dolichiscus Richardson, 1913
 Pseudarcturella Tattersall, 1921
 Scyllarcturella Poore & Bardsley, 1992

References

Isopoda